Rocío Esmeralda Reza Gallegos (born 19 April 1968) is a Mexican politician affiliated with the PAN. As of 2013 she served as Deputy of the LXII Legislature of the Mexican Congress representing Chihuahua.

References

1968 births
Living people
Politicians from Chihuahua (state)
Women members of the Chamber of Deputies (Mexico)
National Action Party (Mexico) politicians
21st-century Mexican politicians
21st-century Mexican women politicians
Mexican people of Iranian descent
People from Ciudad Cuauhtémoc, Chihuahua
Autonomous University of Chihuahua alumni
Members of the Congress of Chihuahua
Deputies of the LXII Legislature of Mexico
Members of the Chamber of Deputies (Mexico) for Chihuahua (state)